Xenon is a chemical element with symbol Xe and atomic number 54.

Xenon may also refer to:

Computing
Xenon (processor), the Xbox 360 CPU
Xenon (program), a Dutch web spider intended to discover tax evasion
LG Xenon, a mobile phone manufactured by LG Electronics
Xenon, a codename for the Xbox 360

Entertainment

Games
Xenon (pinball)
Xenon (video game)
Self-replicating spacecraft in the X video game series
A planet in the Space Quest series

Other entertainment
Xenon (manga), a Japanese manga by Masaomi Kanzaki
The Xenon Codex, a 1988 album by Hawkwind
Xenon Entertainment, a film distribution company
Xenon, a robot from the Superhuman Samurai Syber-Squad television show

People
Xenon (general), a Seleucid general
Xenon (tyrant), a tyrant of the ancient Greek city of Hermione

Vehicles
Celier Xenon 2, a Polish autogyro
Celier Xenon 4, a Maltese autogyro
Tata Xenon, an Indian pickup truck

Other uses
Xenon (nightclub), a former New York City nightclub
Xenon, a Campagnolo groupset
Xenon arc lamp
XENON Dark Matter Search Experiment

See also

Xenic (disambiguation)
Xeno (disambiguation)
Xeon, an Intel CPU
Zeno (disambiguation)
Zenon (disambiguation)
 Xe (disambiguation)
 
 
 Isotopes of xenon